is a railway station on the Kagoshima Main Line operated by JR Kyushu in Yahatahigashi-ku, Kitakyushu, Japan.

History
On 12 October 1909, the station became part of the Hitoyoshi Main Line and then on 21 November 1909, part of the Kagoshima Main Line. With the privatization of Japanese National Railways (JNR), the successor of JGR, on 1 April 1987, JR Kyushu took over control of the station.

Passenger statistics
In fiscal 2016, the station was used by 2,962 passengers daily, and it ranked 62nd among the busiest stations of JR Kyushu.

References

External links
Edamitsu Station (JR Kyushu)

Railway stations in Fukuoka Prefecture
Railway stations in Japan opened in 1908